Goodwin Glacier is a glacier flowing west into Flandres Bay southward of Pelletan Point on the west coast of Graham Land, Antarctica. It was charted by the Belgian Antarctic Expedition under Gerlache, 1897–99. It was named by the UK Antarctic Place-Names Committee in 1960 for Hannibal Goodwin, an American pastor who invented the first transparent nitrocellulose flexible photographic roll-film in 1887.

References

Glaciers of Danco Coast